Lillerød BK (Lillerød Badmintonklub) is a badminton club based  in Lillerød in the northern part of the Greater Copenhagen area. The club was founded on 7 November 1940. It has won the Danish Badminton League four times and Europe League three times.

Achievements

Europe Cup
Champion: 1993, 1994, 1995

Danish Badminton League
Champion: 1992–93, 1993–94, 1994–95, 1995-96

References

External links
 Official website

Badminton clubs in Denmark
Allerød Municipality
Sports clubs established in 1940
1940 establishments in Denmark